The Low-Density Supersonic Decelerator or LDSD is a reentry vehicle designed to test techniques for atmospheric entry on Mars. The disc-shaped LDSD uses an inflatable structure called the Supersonic Inflatable Aerodynamic Decelerator (SIAD), which is essentially a donut-shaped balloon, to create atmospheric drag in order to decelerate the vehicle before deploying a large supersonic parachute. The goal of the $230 m project is to develop a reentry system capable of landing 2- to 3-ton payloads on Mars, as opposed to the 1-ton limit of the currently used systems.

The vehicle is being developed and tested by NASA's Jet Propulsion Laboratory. Mark Adler is the project manager.

The vehicle was tested in 2014 and 2015.

June 2014 test flight

The test flight took place on June 28, 2014, with the test vehicle launching from the United States Navy's Pacific Missile Range Facility on Kauaʻi, Hawaiʻi, at 18:45 UTC (08:45 local). The vehicle detached at 21:05 UTC (11:05 local), and four small, solid-fuel rocket motors spun up the vehicle to provide stability.

Immediately after rocket burn-out, four more rocket motors despun the vehicle. Upon slowing to Mach 4.08, the  tube-shaped Supersonic Inflatable Aerodynamic Decelerator (SIAD-R configuration) deployed. SIAD is intended to increase atmospheric drag on the vehicle by increasing the surface area of its leading side, thus increasing the rate of deceleration.

Upon slowing to Mach 2.54 (around 86 seconds after SIAD deployment), the Supersonic Disksail (SSDS) parachute was deployed to slow the vehicle further. This parachute measures  in diameter, twice the area of the one used for the Mars Science Laboratory mission. However, it began tearing apart after deployment, and the vehicle impacted the Pacific Ocean at 21:35 UTC (11:35 local) travelling . All hardware and data recorders were recovered. Despite the parachute incident, the mission was declared a success; the primary goal was proving the flight worthiness of the test vehicle, while SIAD and SSDS were secondary experiments.

2015 test flights
A second test flight of LDSD took place in June 2015, at the Pacific Missile Range Facility. This test focused on the  SIAD-R and Supersonic Ringsail (SSRS) technologies, incorporating lessons learned during the 2014 test. Changes planned for the parachute included a rounder shape and structural reinforcement. After several weather-related scrubs, the flight occurred on June 8. As in the first test, the SIAD structure inflated successfully but the parachute was damaged during deployment, this time after 600 ms and at  drag.

After 2015
A 3rd test was expected in 2016, after some smaller scale tests with sounding rockets.

The parachute team are hoping Mars 2020 will have a camera on the parachute deployment and opening in 2021.

Gallery

See also 
 HIAD, NASA's Hypersonic Inflatable Aerodynamic Decelerator
 LOFTID, 2022 test from Earth orbit

References

External links

LDSD project website
LDSD fact sheet

NASA programs
Spaceflight technology
Exploration of Mars
Articles containing video clips
Inflatable aircraft